Djalma Feitosa Dias (born 9 December 1970), known as Djalminha , is a Brazilian football pundit and retired professional footballer who played as an attacking midfielder.

Blessed with superb skill and technical ability but possessing a troublesome character, he represented among others Flamengo, Palmeiras and Deportivo de La Coruña, and was also a Brazil international.

Club career

Brazil
Son of former footballer Djalma Dias, Djalminha (Little Djalma) was born in Santos, São Paulo, while his father was playing for Santos. He started his career at Flamengo, based in Rio de Janeiro.

Afterwards, Djalminha played for Guarani (being briefly loaned, in 1994, to Shimizu S-Pulse in Japan) and then Palmeiras, where he received the Bola de Ouro (Brazilian Golden Ball) award in 1996.

Deportivo de La Coruña
In July 1997, Djalminha joined Spanish club Deportivo de La Coruña, where he scored 26 La Liga goals in 87 appearances in his first three seasons there, playing a significant role in the club's first (and, to date, only) La Liga conquest in 1999–2000. After that, however, the emergence of Juan Carlos Valerón, signed upon Atlético Madrid's relegation, meant less playing time for Djalminha. This was followed by a May 2002 heated confrontation during training with Depor manager Javier Irureta, prompted his loan to Austrian Football Bundesliga side FK Austria Wien in the summer of 2002.

After just 11 appearances for Deportivo in the 2003–04 campaign, Djalminha finished his career with Mexico's Club América, retiring at 34.

Indoor football
In 2008, Djalminha returned to Depor, joining its indoor football team alongside club greats Donato, Fran, Noureddine Naybet and Jacques Songo'o.

International career
The stiff competition in Brazil in Djalminha's position of attacking midfielder, combined with his somewhat difficult temperament, limited him to just 14 full international caps in six years, the vast majority coming while at Deportivo. He was part of the squad that won the 1997 Copa América, and of the Brazil team that played in Le Tournoi, also in 1997.

Djalminha was due to be called to the 2002 FIFA World Cup, but was finally not chosen by Luiz Felipe Scolari after his incident with Irureta days before the announcement of the final squad, losing his place to Kaká.

Career statistics

Club

International

Honours

Football
Flamengo
Copa do Brasil: 1990
Campeonato Carioca: 1991
Campeonato Brasileiro Série A: 1992

Palmeiras
Campeonato Paulista: 1996

Deportivo
La Liga: 1999–2000
Copa del Rey: 2001–02
Supercopa de España: 2000, 2002

Austria Wien
Austrian Football Bundesliga: 2002–03

Brazil
Copa América: 1997

Individual
Bola de Prata: 1993, 1996
Bola de Ouro: 1996

Indoor football
Deportivo
Spanish League: 2007–08, 2009–10
Spanish Cup: 2007–08, 2009–10

Flamengo
Brazilian Championship: 2009

Brazil
Indoor Football World Cup: 2006

Individual
Indoor Football World Cup MVP: 2006
Brazilian Championship Top Scorer: 2009

References

External links

Deportivo archives

1970 births
Living people
Footballers from Rio de Janeiro (city)
People from Santos, São Paulo
Naturalised citizens of Spain
Brazilian footballers
Association football midfielders
Campeonato Brasileiro Série A players
CR Flamengo footballers
Sociedade Esportiva Palmeiras players
Guarani FC players
J1 League players
Shimizu S-Pulse players
La Liga players
Deportivo de La Coruña players
Austrian Football Bundesliga players
FK Austria Wien players
Liga MX players
Club América footballers
Brazil international footballers
1997 Copa América players
Copa América-winning players
Brazilian expatriate footballers
Brazilian expatriate sportspeople in Japan
Expatriate footballers in Japan
Brazilian expatriate sportspeople in Spain
Expatriate footballers in Spain
Brazilian expatriate sportspeople in Austria
Expatriate footballers in Austria
Brazilian expatriate sportspeople in Mexico
Expatriate footballers in Mexico